The Pedaliante (Italian for "Pedal Glider") was a human-powered aircraft designed and built by Enea Bossi and Vittorio Bonomi and credited with, in 1936, making one of the first fully human-powered flights. The aircraft successfully traveled  as part of an Italian competition, but was denied the monetary prize due to its catapult launch.

History

Early development
In 1932, Enea Bossi heard of an airplane which had successfully flown while powered only by a  engine. This prompted Bossi to calculate the minimum power that a manned aircraft would need to fly.

During a trip to Philadelphia, Bossi tested the speed at which a glider would take off under tow. The experiment consisted of hiring a professional bicyclist to tow a glider. A spring scale was attached to the tow line to sense the force exerted by the bicyclist, the results confirming that a speed at which the necessary lift could be obtained was indeed attainable. This same experimental procedure was later repeated as part of the development of the Gossamer Condor and the Gossamer Albatross.

Bossi concluded, erroneously, that a successful human-powered aircraft would therefore require two counter-rotating propellers to cancel out the effects of torque.

In 1933, the Frankfurt Polytechnische Gesellschaft (Frankfurt Polytechnic Society) offered a prize to promote human-powered flight. Due to the newly-formed Rome-Berlin axis, similar political and military events were staged during the initial period in both Italy and Germany to help strengthen that bond. To this end, in 1936, the Italian government initiated an equivalent contest: offering 100,000 lire for a 1 km (0.62 mi) human-powered flight made by an Italian citizen. Bossi was aware that he could not receive the prize due to his American citizenship, but he opted to attempt to win it, anyway.

Aircraft design
Bossi's human-powered aircraft, named the Pedaliante, utilized conventional glider configuration and construction. The control surfaces consisted of a conventional rear rudder, elevator, and a pair of roll spoilers on the wings – all activated by a divided control yoke. The pilot sat semi-upright, and a bicycle chain transmitted the power from the pedals to an overhead transverse shaft that was bevel-geared to the two propellers, which extended from the wing on each side of the fuselage.

Vittorio Bonomi, an Italian sailplane manufacturer, was contracted to build the aircraft.

Flights
Bossi and Bonomi enlisted Emilio Casco, a major in the Italian Army and a very strong bicyclist, to pilot the Pedaliante. After several weeks of trials in early 1936, Casco took off in the Pedaliante and flew  completely under his own power. Although subsequent calculations have verified that this flight was physically possible, most agree that it was Casco's considerable physical strength and endurance which made the accomplishment feasible; it was not a feat which could be attained by a typical person.

Despite the additional thrust, the team still found the aircraft to be too heavy to travel the  the contest demanded.

This set a world record for human-powered flight, but as a catapult launch was not permitted in the rules of the competition, the Pedaliante did not win the prize for which it was designed. The aircraft was retired the following year having made a total 80 flights – 43 without the assistance of a catapult launch. At the time, the Mufli and the Pedaliante were the most advanced human-powered aircraft ever built.

Specifications

References

1930s Italian experimental aircraft
Human-powered aircraft
Single-engined twin-prop tractor aircraft
High-wing aircraft
Italian inventions
Aircraft manufactured in Italy
Aircraft first flown in 1936